Connor Anton Brown (born 2 October 1991) is an English professional footballer who playes as a right back for National League North club Buxton. He has played in the Football League for Oldham Athletic and Carlisle United.

Career

Sheffield United
Brown was born in Sheffield, South Yorkshire. He started his career with Sheffield United as a junior in their Academy before signing a professional contract in the summer of 2011. After failing to make the breakthrough into the first team, he was released in the summer of 2012.

Oldham Athletic
Brown signed a one-year contract with Sheffield United's League One rivals Oldham Athletic on 8 June 2012, with the option of a further year. In his first season with the club, Brown made 29 appearances in all competitions.

In May 2013, he was rewarded with the one-year option on his contract being exercised.

At the end of the 2013–14 season, Brown was offered a new contract. In spite of this, he was seldom in the starting line-up at the beginning of the 2014–15 season and on 3 November 2014 he joined League Two club Carlisle United on loan. He played nine matches there before returning to Oldham on 3 January 2015.

On 31 August 2016, Brown had his contract terminated by mutual consent after four years at the club.

Guiseley and York City
Brown signed for National League club Guiseley on 29 September 2016.

On 20 January 2018, Brown joined National League North club York City on loan until the end of the 2017–18 season. He made his debut the same day, starting in a 2–2 draw at home to Spennymoor Town. Having made four appearances, he signed for York permanently on 13 February 2018. Brown totalled 11 appearances as York finished 2017–18 in 11th place in the table. He was released at the end of the season.

Barrow
Brown signed for National League club Barrow on 9 July 2018.

Buxton
On February 3 2023, Brown signed for National League North side Buxton.

Suspension from Sheffield United

Following the conviction of teammate Ched Evans for rape in 2012, Brown posted defamatory comments about the victim on social networking service Twitter and was subsequently suspended by Sheffield United before being released.

Career statistics

References

External links

Profile at the Barrow A.F.C. website

1991 births
Living people
Footballers from Sheffield
English footballers
Association football defenders
Sheffield United F.C. players
Eastwood Town F.C. players
Hinckley United F.C. players
Oldham Athletic A.F.C. players
Carlisle United F.C. players
Guiseley A.F.C. players
York City F.C. players
Barrow A.F.C. players
National League (English football) players
English Football League players